Colin Hay (born 9 November 1968) is Professor of Political Sciences at Sciences Po, Paris and Affiliate Professor of Political Analysis at the University of Sheffield, joint editor-in-chief of the journal Comparative European Politics. and Managing Editor of the journal New Political Economy.

Education 
Hay studied Social and Political Science at Clare College, Cambridge, and moved to the Department of Sociology at Lancaster University to research his PhD under the supervision of Bob Jessop.

Career 
After completing his PhD, Hay worked at the University of Birmingham, where he was head of the Department of Political Science and International Studies between 2002 and 2005. He moved to Paris in 2013.

Selected bibliography

Books 
 
  
 
 
 
 
 
 
 
 

As editor:
 
 
 
 
 
 
 
 
 
 
 
 

Hay won the Political Studies Association W J M Mackenzie Book Prize for the best political science book published in 2007 at the 2008 PSA Awards.

Journal articles

References

External links
Homepage at the University of Sheffield

Academics of the University of Birmingham
Academics of the University of Sheffield
Alumni of Clare College, Cambridge
Alumni of Lancaster University
British political scientists
Living people
1968 births